gigabyte (GB) is 10003 bytes.

Gigabyte may also refer to:

 gibibyte (GiB), 10243 bytes, also called "gigabyte" (GB)
 Gigabyte (virus writer), moniker of Kimberley Vanvaeck, for computer viruses
 Gigabyte Technology, a computer corporation of Taiwan
 Gigabyte (character), a fictional character from the CG animated children's TV show ReBoot, see List of ReBoot characters

See also
 Giga Bite (character), a fictional video game character from the game Resident Evil Outbreak: File 2
 Gigabit (Gb), 109 bits
 Gibibit (Gib), 230 bits
 GB (disambiguation)
 Giga (disambiguation)
 Byte (disambiguation)